Sebseb is a town and commune in Métlili District, Ghardaïa Province, Algeria. According to the 2008 census it has a population of 2,437, up from 2,428 in 1998, with an annual growth rate of 0.0%, the lowest in the province. Its postal code is 47230 and its municipal code is 4709.

Climate

Sebseb has a hot desert climate (Köppen climate classification BWh), with very hot summers and mild winters, and very little precipitation throughout the year.

Transportation

A local road connects Sebseb to Route N1 (the Trans-Sahara Highway) to the southeast and to the N107 just west of Metlili to the north.

Education

5.9% of the population has a tertiary education, and another 20.2% has completed secondary education. The overall literacy rate is 76.2%, and is 82.1% among males and 70.0% among females.

Localities
The commune of Sebseb is composed of one locality:

Seb Seb et ses environs

References

Neighbouring towns and cities

Communes of Ghardaïa Province
Algeria